Teresa Sławomira Torańska (January 1, 1944 – January 2, 2013) was a Polish journalist and writer. She was perhaps best known for her award winning monograph, Oni.

Biography
Teresa Torańska was born on January 1, 1944, in Wołkowysk (since 1945 in Belarus), which was then part of the Second Polish Republic occupied by the Soviet Union. Following World War II she graduated from the Warsaw University's Department of Law. She worked as a journalist for the popular Polish weekly "Kultura” in the 1970s, and then throughout the following decade, for the leading Polish émigré literary journal Kultura paryska, banned in communist Poland and published in Paris, France. Her book Them (Pl:Oni) was a breakthrough best seller that led to frequent parallels with Oriana Fallaci as a superb interviewer. Her probing interviewing style is perhaps best demonstrated by her disrobing on camera expose of the communist strongman General Wojciech Jaruzelski. In the 1990s, Torańska hosted two television programs for Telewizja Polska (TVP): socio-political "Teraz Wy” (Now You) and historical "Powtórka z PRL-u” (Rehash from the PRL). Torańska wrote the screenplay for a documentary film Dworzec gdański (Gdańsk Main Station) directed by Maria Zmarz-Kozanowicz. The movie, which premiered in 2007, told a story of the Polish Jews forced to leave Poland after the political crisis of March 1968.

Before her death in 2013, she was a contributor to Poland's second-largest daily newspaper Gazeta Wyborcza, conducting interviews with the leading Polish political figures.

Torańska was perhaps best known for her award winning book Them: Stalin's Polish Puppets (Oni), published in the United States by HarperCollins.


Teresa Torańska died on January 2, 2013, a day after her 69th birthday, after a long struggle with lung cancer. Torańska was buried on January 9, 2013, at Powązki Military Cemetery.

Works
 Widok z dolu (The View from Below) (reportage), publisher: Iskry; 1 edition (1980), 162 pages, language: Polish, 
 Oni (Them: Stalin's Polish Puppets), HarperCollins Publishers (May 1988), 384 pages, translated by Agnieszka Kołakowska,  (paperback, hardcover)
 My (We), publisher: Oficyna Wydawnicza MOST; 1st edition (1994), 295 pages, language: Polish, also published as e-book
 Byli (Bygones), (reportage), publisher: Świat Książki, Warsaw 2006, 318 pages, language: Polish,  (hardcover)
 Są - Rozmowa o dobrych uczuciach (They are - Conversation about Good Feelings), Świat Książki, Warsaw 2007, 288 pages, language: Polish  (hardcover)
 Dworzec gdański (Gdańsk Train Station) documentary directed by Maria Zmarz-Kozanowicz, Poland, 2007
 Jesteśmy (We are), Świat Książki – Bertelsmann Media, Warsaw 2008, 
 Śmierć spóźnia się o minutę (Death is a minute too late), Biblioteka Gazety Wyborczej, Warsaw 2010,

Awards
 In 2000 Teresa Torańska received the Ksawery Pruszyński Award of the Polish PEN Club for the book Them: Stalin's Polish Puppets.
 Torańska was the first recipient of the annual Barbara Łopieńska Award for the best press interview, received in 2005 for her conversation with Wojciech Jaruzelski.

References

External links
 Teresa Torańska's home site

1944 births
2013 deaths
Polish women writers
Burials at Powązki Military Cemetery